Breechbill-Davidson House is a historic home located near Garrett in Keyser Township, DeKalb County, Indiana.  It was built in 1889, and is a two-story, Italianate-style brick dwelling with Federal detailing. It hipped roof and rear wing.

It was added to the National Register of Historic Places in 1983.

References

Houses on the National Register of Historic Places in Indiana
Italianate architecture in Indiana
Federal architecture in Indiana
Houses completed in 1889
Houses in DeKalb County, Indiana
National Register of Historic Places in DeKalb County, Indiana